Versus is a studio album by Carl Craig. It was released via InFiné on May 5, 2017.

Critical reception

At Metacritic, which assigns a weighted average score out of 100 to reviews from mainstream critics, the album received an average score of 78, based on 7 reviews, indicating "generally favorable reviews".

Paul Simpson of AllMusic gave the album 4 out of 5 stars, commenting that "Pieces will often suspensefully build up for several minutes before a beat gallops in, but it never resembles the predictable build-up-and-drop formula of most mainstream club music." Daniel Sylvester of Exclaim! wrote, "Although Versus is certainly not a place for casual Craig fans to start, nor is it designed for the dance floor crowd, it's an achievement that appropriately showcases one of Detroit's finest exports."

Mixmag placed it at number 31 on the "Top 50 Albums of 2017" list.

Track listing

Charts

References

2017 albums
Carl Craig albums